The 1891 East Dorset by-election was held on 27 November 1891 after the death of the incumbent Conservative MP George Hawkesworth Bond.  The seat was retained by the Conservative candidate Humphrey Napier Sturt.

References 

By-elections to the Parliament of the United Kingdom in Dorset constituencies
November 1891 events
1891 elections in the United Kingdom
1891 in England
19th century in Dorset